Bānhūs is the third studio album by the Australian post-hardcore band Eleventh He Reaches London. The name "Bānhūs" comes from the Old English word meaning ‘body’, literally translating as ‘bone-house’. It was released by Hobbledehoy Records in October 2013 with pre-orders being sent out in late September of the same year. The album is notably different from the band's other work as it takes a much darker, somber form.

An outtake from the album, dubbed "Scorpion Entertainment Owes Us $1,000", was released in November 2016 as part of the Hobbledehoy Records compilation album, "Ten Years (Thank You)".

Track listing
All music written by Eleventh He Reaches London, lyrics by Ian Lenton.

Personnel
Ian Lenton – vocals, electric guitar
Jayden Worts – electric guitar
Jeremy Martin – electric guitar
Luke Pollard – bass guitar
Mark Donaldson – drums, percussion
Ron Pollard – vocals, piano, synthesizer
Simon Struthers – mastering

References

2013 albums
Eleventh He Reaches London albums